Many artistic influences transited along the Silk Road, especially through the Central Asia, where Hellenistic, Iranian, Indian and Chinese influence were able to interact. In particular Greco-Buddhist art represent one of the most vivid examples of this interaction.
As shown on the 1st century CE Silk Road map, there is no single road but a whole network of long-distance routes: mainly two land routes and one sea route.

Scythian art
Following contacts of metropolitan China with nomadic western and northwestern border territories in the 8th century BCE, gold was introduced from Central Asia,  and Chinese jade carvers began to make imitation designs of the steppes, adopting the Scythian-style animal art of the steppes (descriptions of animals locked in combat). This style is particularly reflected in the rectangular belt plaques made of gold and bronze with alternate versions in jade and steatite.

Even though that happened, the correspondence between the "Scythians" as an ethnic group and their material culture is still subject to discussion and research. The subject is  part of the broader "nomadic" and "sedentary"  debate.

Hellenistic art

Following the expansion of the Greco-Bactrians into Central Asia, Greek influences on Han art have often been suggested (Hirth, Rostovtzeff). Designs with rosette flowers, geometric lines, and glass inlays, suggestive of Hellenistic influences, can be found on some early Han dynasty bronze mirrors.

Greco-Buddhist art

Buddha

The image of the Buddha, originating during the 1st century CE in Gandhara in what is now modern day's Pakistan and Mathura in northern India was transmitted progressively through Central Asia and then China until it reached Japan in the 6th century.

To this day however the transmission of many iconographical details is still visible, such as the Hercules inspiration behind the Nio guardian deities in front of Japanese Buddhist temples, or representations of the Buddha reminiscent of Greek art such as the Buddha in Kamakura.

Eastern iconography in the West

Some elements of western iconography were adopted from the East along the Silk Road. The aureole in Christian art first appeared in the 5th century, but practically the same device was known several centuries earlier, in non-Christian art. It is found in some Persian representations of kings and Gods, and appears on coins of the Kushan kings Kanishka, Huvishka and Vasudeva, as well as on most representations of the Buddha in Greco-Buddhist art from the 1st century CE.
Another image which appears to have transferred from China via the Silk Road is the symbol of the Three hares, showing three animals running in a circle. It has been traced back to the Sui dynasty in China, and is still to be found in sacred sites in many parts of Western Europe, and especially in churches in Dartmoor, Devon.

Case studies

Shukongoshin

Another Buddhist deity, named Shukongoshin, one of the wrath-filled protector deities of Buddhist temples in Japan, is also an interesting case of transmission of the image of the famous Greek god Herakles to the Far-East along the Silk Road. Herakles was used in Greco-Buddhist art to represent Vajrapani, the protector of the Buddha, and his representation was then used in China and Japan to depict the protector gods of Buddhist temples.

Wind god
Various other artistic influences from the Silk Road can be found in Asia, one of the most striking being that of the Greek Wind God Boreas, transiting through Central Asia and China to become the Japanese Shinto wind god Fūjin.

In consistency with Greek iconography for Boreas, the Japanese wind god holds above his head with his two hands a draping or "wind bag" in the same general attitude. The abundance of hair have been kept in the Japanese rendering, as well as exaggerated facial features.

Floral scroll pattern
Finally, the Greek artistic motif of the floral scroll was transmitted from the Hellenistic world to the area of the Tarim Basin around the 2nd century CE, as seen in Serindian art and wooden architectural remains. It then was adopted by China between the 4th and 6th century, where it is found on tiles and ceramics, and was then transmitted to Japan where it is found quite literally in the decoration of the roof tiles of Japanese Buddhist temples from around the 7th century.

The clearest one are from the 7th century Nara temple building tiles, some of them exactly depicting vines and grapes. These motifs have evolved towards more symbolic representations, but essentially remain to this day in the roof tile decorations of many Japanese traditional-style buildings.

See also
Scythian art
Greco-Buddhist art
Silk Road transmission of Buddhism
Mogao Caves
Longmen Grottoes

Notes

References
 Alexander the Great: East-West Cultural contacts from Greece to Japan. Tokyo: NHK Puromōshon and Tokyo National Museum, 2003.
 Jerry H.Bentley. Old World Encounters: Cross-cultural Contacts and Exchanges in Pre-modern Times. Oxford–NY: Oxford University Press, 1993. 
 John Boardman. The Diffusion of Classical Art in Antiquity. Princeton, NJ: Princeton University Press, 1994. 
 Osmund Bopearachchi, Christian Landes, and Christine Sachs. De l'Indus à l'Oxus : Archéologie de l'Asie centrale. Lattes, France: Association IMAGO & Musée de Lattes, 2003. 
 Elizabeth Errington, Joe Cribb, & Maggie Claringbull, eds. The Crossroads of Asia: Transformation in Image and Symbols. Cambridge: Ancient India and Iran Trust, 1992, 
 Richard Foltz. Religions of the Silk Road: Premodern Patterns of Globalization, 2nd edn. NY: Palgrave Macmillan, 2010. 
 J.P. Mallory & Victor Mair. The Tarim Mummies. London: Thames and Hudson, 2000. 
 William Woodthorpe Tarn. The Greeks in Bactria and India. Cambridge: Cambridge University Press, 1951.

External links
Along the ancient silk routes: Central Asian art from the West Berlin State Museums, an exhibition catalog from The Metropolitan Museum of Art (fully available online as PDF)

Silk Road
Iconography
Asian art
Ancient Central Asian art